Carmarthen Quins Rugby Football Club are one of two Welsh rugby union clubs based in Carmarthen in West Wales, the other being Carmarthen Athletic.

They currently play in the Welsh Premier Division and are a feeder club for the Scarlets regional team.

Club history
During the 2005–06 season Carmarthen Quins were relegated from the Welsh Premier Division and placed in Division One West, making a return to the Premier league after winning the West league in 2008–09. Carmarthen were to face Blackwood, winners of Division One East in a play-off for promotion; but because Blackwood's ground was deemed not to meet WRU standards for the Premier league, the game was forfeited.

Club honours
 WRU Division One West Champions: 2008–09

Current squad

Notable former players
See :Category:Carmarthen Quins RFC players

References

Welsh rugby union teams
Rugby clubs established in 1875
Sport in Carmarthenshire